CAM Academy is an alternative school in the Battle Ground School District. The school offers education to students from grades 3–12.

References

External links
School website

Schools in Clark County, Washington
Alternative education